Kadmat Island, also known as Cardamom Island, is a coral island belonging to the Amindivi subgroup of islands of the Lakshadweep archipelago in India. The ecological feature of the island is of coral reef with seagrass, and marine turtles which nestle here. The Ministry of Environment and Forests (India) has notified the island as a marine protected area for ensuring conservation of the island's animal, plant, or other type of organism, and other resources.

The only inhabited village on the island is Kadmat, which had a population of 5,389 according to 2011 census. Fisheries is the main economic activity on the island with agriculture limited to 5% of the land area. Tourism is allowed even for non-Indians and the attractions are kayaking, snorkeling and leisure trips by a glass-bottomed boat for scuba diving.

Geography and climate

Kadmat Island, which belongs to the township of Kadmat Island of Aminidivi Tehsil. is the central most island of the Lakshadweep archipelago. It is in the shape of a tear drop, with  area and is located on a coral reef.
Its surface formation consists of coral conglomerate overlying broken pieces of coral and coral sand.

It has a shore line and has a sandy beach.

There is an airport on nearby Agatti Island, in which flights operate from Cochin. From Agatti, it is a two and half hours boat ride to Kadmat. Ferry services also operate from Cochin on the coast of Kerala but involves a journey of 16 hours.

Climate and the environment

Humidity averages at 72.5%.

Ecologically, the island is composed of coral reef with seagrass, and marine turtles which nestle here. Keeping this aspect in view, the Ministry of Environment and Forests (India) has notified the island as a marine protected area to enable conservation of the island's animal, plant, or other type of organism, and other resources.  The coral reefs are damaged to the extent of 10% (assessed by IUCN in 1976) due to anthropocentric pressure and also due to climate change. Dredging operation at the entry to the island is causing damage to coral species as the dredged material is dumped into the lagoon. Coral blocks found in the beaches and the coral flats are extracted for building activity on the island. This could cause serious geo-morphological changes of the island in the form of sea erosion of the shores and the beach. Coral bleaching, a natural phenomenon attributed to strong El Niños, which occurred during 1998 due to seawater warming, is reported to have reduced the number of coral species from 45 to 9.

Demographics
The island is inhabited mainly by individuals of the Melacceri caste.
Kadmat village is the only inhabited village on the island. According to the 2011 census the island had a population of 5,389 consisting of 2,676 males and 2,713 females. Population density is 1,727 per km2. Decennial Growth Rate recorded for the period 2001–2011 was 1.03 percent. In 2001, the literacy rate was 87.88 percent of which male literacy rate was 91.78 and female literacy was 92.53; in both cases much higher than of the Lakshadweep island. Malayalam is the dominant language of the people of the island and the literacy rate is as high as 90.4%.

The island has a network of roads, several ponds and wells, primary and higher secondary  schools, electricity, telephone, health centres and so forth.

In 1960, a hoard of coins were unearthed and examined, revealing that the island has been inhabited since at least 200 AD. Kadmat island is known to have traded with the Romans, as in 1948 a girl found a Roman coin in a quarry on the island.

Economy

Fishing is the principal activity of the people of the island. Fishing is done both off shore in the sea and during the monsoon season in the lagoon and reef area. Trawl nets and pole line are used for oceanic tuna fishing. Wooden boats are used for local fishing in the lagoon. Fish species reported include carangids, cephalopods, perches, rainbow sardine, rays, sail fishes, sharks, skipjack tuna, and tuna.  
Agriculture is practised, with about 5% of the land area brought under cultivation. Coconut plantations are common along with associated coir twinning. Crops grown include red grass, groundnut, maize, sweet potato, grains, cereals, millets, papaya, and banana.

Tourism has taken off on the island, though it only has one beach resort for 50 guests. There are kayaking and snorkeling facilities, and leisure trips by a glass-bottomed boat for scuba diving. In 1998 the first Water Sports Institute was established on Kadmat, along with the Laccadives Diving Centre.

Wildlife
The island has three types of habitats: coral reef, seagrass and nesting ground for marine turtles. Zoning of the coral reef is mapped under three zones of reef flat, reef slope and lagoon. Next to the shore line are the fringing reefs where fish species of fin and shell fishes spawn, and are found in abundance. As of 1986, there were 45 coral species in the reef. These are threatened due to human interference and natural causes. Live coral is reported in less than 1% area. There are 9 species of live corals in the lagoon and reef slope area. The species of live corals reported are: Acropora formosa (staghorn coral), Acropora robusta, Acropora, Acropora subglabra,  Acropora tortuosa, Acropora vaughani, Favites, Pocillopora verrucosa and Lobophytum Benthic organisms are reported on the reef slope and lagoon area. Macrobenthos are found in the inter-tidal and sub-tidal area. 23 species of polychaetes, 3 species of bivalves, 3 species of crustaceans, and 3 species of gastropods have been recorded.
  
There are 7 species of seagrass reported here, out of 14 found in the Lakshadweep Islands, including the Thalassia hemprichii and Cymodocea rotundata. Seaweeds recorded consist of 34 species, out of which 14 species are of Rhodophyceae, 13 (red algae)  are Chlorophyceae (green algae) and 7 species are Phaeophyceae (brown algae). 20 species of Phytoplankton and 19 groups of Zooplankton have been recorded in the reef slope and lagoon area; 33 species of benthic organisms have also been noted in the same vicinity.

Notes

References

Bibliography

External links

Hydrographic Description (Indian Ocean Pilot)
Lagoon sizes
Kadmat - Geographical information

List of Atolls
An ornithological expedition to the Lakshadweep archipelago
Sources towards a history of the Laccadive Islands
FAO - An analysis of the carrying Capacity of Lakshadweep Coral Reefs

Islands of Lakshadweep
Underwater diving sites in India
Cities and towns in Lakshadweep district
Atolls of India
Islands of India
Populated places in India